Viktor Jedinák (born 8 February 1998) is a Slovak footballer who last played for Petržalka as a forward.

Club career

FK Senica
Jedinák made his professional Fortuna Liga debut for Senica on 20 May 2016 against Spartak Myjava in a 1–1 tie, substituting future Slovak international Samuel Mráz in the 86th minute.

References

External links
 FK Senica profile
 UEFA profile
 
 Futbalnet profile

1998 births
Living people
Slovak footballers
Association football forwards
FK Senica players
FK Železiarne Podbrezová players
MFK Ružomberok players
FC Petržalka players
Slovak Super Liga players
2. Liga (Slovakia) players